Tırtar  is a village in Toroslar district of Mersin Province, Turkey,  where the capital city of Toroslar district is actually a part of Greater Mersin. The name of the village refers to a once-nomadic Turkmen tribe. The main economic activity of the village is agriculture.

References

Villages in Toroslar District